Liparis agassizii, in one instance called "agassiz's snailfish", is a fish from the genus Liparis. It lives in the North Pacific Ocean at a depth range between zero and one hundred meters. The fish may especially be found from the Iwate Prefecture to Hokkaido, off the coast of Primorskiy, off the western and southeastern coast of Sakhalin, and in the southern Kuril Islands.

Named in honor of Louis Agassiz.

Description
The fish's body may be brown, gray, or blackish, with either a striped, speckled, mottled, or plain pattern. It grows to a maximum length of 44 cm (TL).

References

Liparis (fish)
Taxa named by Frederic Ward Putnam
Fish described in 1874